The Cañeros de Los Mochis are a Mexican baseball team in the Liga Mexicana del Pacífico. They play in Los Mochis in the state of Sinaloa. They have won the league championship four times.

The Cañeros won their most recent championship on January, 28th 2023(2022-23 season). They defeated the Algodoneros de Guasave  in six games, bringing their total to four championships.

Roster

References 

Mexican Pacific League teams
Los Mochis
Sports teams in Sinaloa
Baseball teams established in 1947
1947 establishments in Mexico